A Bag of Marbles is a 1975 French film based on the 1973 autobiographical novel Un sac de billes by Joseph Joffo. Doillon made use of mainly non-professional actors, as also in his next film with children, La Drôlesse (1979).

Among the non-professional actors, the father - who is captured and sent to Auschwitz - is played by Jo Goldenberg, owner of the famous deli at 7, Rue des Rosiers in Paris's Jewish district, which 7 years after the film was the site of the Chez Jo Goldenberg restaurant attack.

Cast 
 Richard Constantini : young Joseph 
 Paul-Eric Shulmann : young Maurice 
 Joseph Goldenberg : their father
 Reine Bartève : their mother
 Hubert Drac : Henri 
 Gilles Laurent : Albert 
 Michel Robin : Mancelier 
 Dominique Ducros : Françoise 
 Stephan Meldegg : sous-officier salon de coiffure 
 Axel Ganz : officier salon de coiffure 
 Pierre Forget : the teacher
 Marc Eyraud : priest on train 
 Hélène Calzarelli : young girl on train 
 Yves Wecker : Raymond, le passeur 
 Bernadette Le Saché : la réfugiée 
 Antonino Faa Di Bruno : le vieux beau 
 Antoine Neri : l'Italien de la bargue 
 Max Vialle : le concierge 
 Dominique Besnehard : le moniteur 
 Alain Peysson :  Ferdinand 
 Hans Verner : l'officier allemand 
 Dieter Schidor

References

1975 films
Films directed by Jacques Doillon
Films scored by Philippe Sarde
French drama films
1970s French-language films
1970s French films